NRK Troján is a Swedish rugby club in Norrköping. They currently play in Mälardalsserien with Linköpings Rugbyklubb.

History
The club was founded in 1956. Their first match was against now-defunct Stockholm side Vikingarna, which they won 9–8.

External links
NRK Troján

Swedish rugby union teams
Sport in Norrköping
Rugby clubs established in 1956
1956 establishments in Sweden